Hjartås is a village in Alver municipality, located in Vestland county, Norway. The village lies along the Herdlefjorden on the western coast of the island of Holsnøy. The village is a part of the urban area of Holme.

References

Villages in Vestland
Alver (municipality)